Graham Gotch (6 August 1936 – 5 October 2011) was  a former Australian rules footballer who played with Fitzroy in the Victorian Football League (VFL).

Notes

External links 
		

1936 births
2011 deaths
Australian rules footballers from Victoria (Australia)
Fitzroy Football Club players